Beefwood is the name given to a number of Australian trees which have timber with a red colouration resembling raw beef as follows:

Barringtonia calyptrata, also known as Cornbeefwood.
Barringtonia racemosa, also known as Cornbeefwood.
Bischofia javanica
Floydia praealta (Syn.: Macadamia praealta) 
Grevillea glauca, also known as Beefwood tree.
Grevillea parallela, also known as Narrow-leaved Beefwood.  
Grevillea striata, also known as Western Beefwood.  
Orites excelsa, also known as White Beefwood. 
Stenocarpus salignus also known as Killarney Beefwood or Scrub Beefwood.
Stenocarpus sinuatus also known as White Beefwood.

Some Casuarinaceae species are also referred to as Beefwoods, Casuarina equisetifolia, Casuarina cunninghamiana, Allocasuarina verticillata, Allocasuarina distyla (Syn.: Casuarina stricta) etc.

Furthers:
 also Manilkara bidentata and Manilkara spp. from South and Central America and the Caribbean
 and Swartzia panacoco (Syn.: Robinia panacoco), Swartzia tomentosa, Rhizophora mangle 

In German also the term „Pferdefleischholz“; Horseflesh wood or „Bulletrie-, Bolletrieholz“ is given to these woods

Others are:
Ardisia escallonioides
Guapira fragrans, Guapira obtusata, Guapira discolor
Myrsine coriacea (Syn.: Ardisia coriacea) 
Roupala montana, from Middle America to North South America
Schoepfia spp, Schoepfia obovata White Beefwood, Schoepfia schreberi Island Beefwood 
Zygia latifolia, Clausena anisata, as Horsewood

See also 
 Sabicu wood or Hieronyma alchorneoides, Caesalpinia spp., Horseflesh Mahogany

References

Flora of Australia
Grevillea taxa by common name